Basi or BASI may refer to:
 Basi, a sugar cane wine.
 Basi (giant panda), a female giant panda. 
 British Association of Snowsport Instructors
 Bureau of Air Safety Investigation (BASI) now part of  the Australian Transport Safety Bureau 
 Laboratórios BASI, a Portuguese pharmaceutical company
 Bulletin of the Astronomical Society of India, the quarterly journal of the Astronomical Society of India.

See also

 Baci
 Bassi (disambiguation)